Andrasch Starke (born 4 January 1974, in Germany) is a jockey in international Thoroughbred horse racing.

Starke began racing at age fifteen as an amateur and since turning professional has won the German riding championship six times. He has competed in Canada and the United States and has won races in Dubai, France, Italy, and Singapore. In recent years Starke has also raced seasonally in Hong Kong where on two occasions he won the Cathay Pacific International Jockeys' Championship at Happy Valley Racecourse. On 2 October 2011 Starke rode German filly Danedream to victory in the 90th Prix de l'Arc de Triomphe at Longchamp and on 21 July 2012 he won in Ascot the King George VI and Queen Elizabeth Stakes with the same filly.

He won nine times the German flat racing Champion Jockey.

References
 Andrasch Starke at JockeysRoom.com
 Andrasch Starke at the NTRA

1974 births
Living people
German jockeys